Orphans is a 1987 American drama film directed by Alan J. Pakula.  Written by Lyle Kessler, based on his 1983 play of the same name, the film follows two orphaned brothers (Matthew Modine and Kevin Anderson) as they navigate life on their own.

Plot
Treat (Matthew Modine) and Phillip (Kevin Anderson) are two brothers living alone in a rundown row house in Newark, New Jersey. Treat, the elder, is a violent pickpocket who spends the day robbing people in order to provide for himself and Phillip. Meanwhile, at home, Phillip tries to educate himself via words in magazines and watching TV.

Treat kidnaps a mysterious man from a bar, with a briefcase full of stocks and bonds. Known as Harold (Albert Finney), he turns the tables on his abductor and begins to assimilate himself into the brothers' lives, turning Treat into a gentleman and giving Phillip the encouragement he needs.

But there are people who have picked up on Harold's disappearance. As Harold helps Phillip overcome his agoraphobia (Treat has him under the influence that he will die upon contact with the outside world), tensions begin to run high in the household.

One night, after an argument between the brothers, Harold returns and is revealed to have been fatally wounded. He dies on the couch, with Phillip by his side. Treat breaks down in tears, and Phillip comforts him.

Cast
 Albert Finney as Harold
 Matthew Modine as Treat
 Kevin Anderson as Phillip
 John Kellogg as Barney
 Anthony Heald as Man in park
 Novella Nelson as Mattie
 Elizabeth Parrish as Rich woman
 B. Constance Barry as Woman in crosswalk
 Frank Ferrara as Cab driver
 Clifford Fearl as Doorman

Critical reception
Vincent Canby of the New York Times enjoyed the film:

Roger Ebert of the Chicago Sun-Times gave it two and a half stars out of four and had this to say:

References

External links 
 
 
 
 

1987 films
1987 drama films
American drama films
1980s English-language films
Films about orphans
American films based on plays
Films shot in New York City
Films directed by Alan J. Pakula
Films scored by Michael Small
1980s American films